Donald Alexander Macdonald  (February 17, 1817 – June 10, 1896) was a Canadian politician.

Born in 1817 in St. Raphael's, Upper Canada, Donald Alexander Macdonald studied at St Raphael's College under the first Catholic Bishop of Ontario, Alexander Macdonell. He became a railway contractor and was elected as a member of the Legislative Assembly of the Province of Canada from 1857 to 1867. He was the Liberal Member of Parliament for Glengarry in the House of Commons of Canada from 1867 to 1875, and served as Postmaster General of Canada. In 1875 Macdonald was appointed the fourth Lieutenant Governor of Ontario and held that post until 1880. He died in Montreal in 1896.

He was the brother of John Sandfield Macdonald, the first Premier of Ontario, and Alexander Francis Macdonald, the MP for Cornwall from 1874 to 1878.

Family
Hon. Donald Alexander Macdonald, P.C., and Lieutenant-Governor of Ontario, 1875–80, married  Catherine Fraser, daughter of Colonel the Hon. Alexander Fraser, M.L.C. of Fraserfield.
The couple`s daughter Margaret was born at Alexandria, Ont., and educated in Montreal. She married, at Toronto, Ontario September 16, 1875, William Hales Hingston, M.D., F.R.C.S. (Lond.), who, was appointed a Commander of the Roman Order of St. Gregory (1875), was knighted by Queen Victoria in 1895, and was called to the Senate of Canada in 1896.

External links 

 Donald Alexander Macdonald fonds, Archives of Ontario

References 

 
 

1817 births
1896 deaths
Lieutenant Governors of Ontario
Members of the House of Commons of Canada from Ontario
Members of the Legislative Assembly of the Province of Canada from Canada West
Members of the King's Privy Council for Canada
Canadian people of Scottish descent
MacDonald, Alexander